Youssef Benali (born 4 February 1995) is a French footballer of Moroccan descent who plays for Moroccan club IR Tanger as a winger.

Club career 

Benali began his career at the Toulouse FC youth academy, where he most commonly played as an attacking midfielder. He made his Ligue 1 debut on 23 November 2014 against Montpellier HSC, replacing Étienne Didot after 81 minutes in a 2-0 away defeat. During his time at Toulouse, Benali appeared in four Ligue 1 matches and a single match in the Coupe de la Ligue. After falling out of contract with Toulouse, he moved to Moroccan club Chabab Rif Al Hoceima on 29 August 2016 with a two year deal.

During the summer 2018, he moved to Concarneau.

International career
Benali made five appearances for the France national U-16 team and one appearance for the France national U-18 team.

Career statistics

References

External links
 
 

1995 births
Living people
French footballers
French sportspeople of Moroccan descent
Ligue 1 players
Championnat National players
Toulouse FC players
US Concarneau players
Chabab Rif Al Hoceima players
Association football forwards